Baihe may refer to:

Mainland China

Counties
Baihe County (白河县, lit. "White Creek"), Ankang, Shaanxi

Towns
Baihe, Guangdong (百合镇), town in Kaiping
Baihe, Gansu (白河镇), town in Li County
Baihe, Guangxi (百合镇), town in Heng County
Baihe, Hebei (白合镇), town in Tang County
Baihe, Mengjin County (白鹤镇), town in Henan
Baihe, Song County (白河镇), town in Henan
Baihe, Hubei (白鹤镇), town in Fang County
Baihe, Shanghai (白鹤镇), town in Qingpu District
Baihe, Sichuan (白合镇), town in Dongxing District, Neijiang
Baihe, Zhejiang (白鹤镇), town in Tiantai County

Townships
Baihe Township in Gansu

Subdistricts
 Baihe Subdistrict (白鹤街道), a subdistrict of Qidong County in Hunan
 Baihe Subdistrict, Ningbo (白鹤街道), a subdistrict of Jiangdong District in Ningbo prefecture-level city, Zhejiang

 Baihe Subdistrict, Nanyang (白河街道), a subdistrict of Wancheng District in Nanyang prefecture-level city, Henan

Taiwan
Baihe, Tainan (白河區)

Other 
 Baihe.com, a Chinese matchmaking company